Batrisitae is a supertribe of ant-loving beetles in the family Staphylinidae. There are about 5 genera and 15 described species in Batrisitae.

Genera
The following genera are accepted within the supertribe Batrisitae:
 Arianops Brendel, 1893 i c g b
 Arthmius LeConte, 1849 i c g b
 Batriasymmodes Park, 1951 i c g b
 Batrisodes Reitter, 1882 i c g b
 Texamaurops Barr & Steeves, 1963 i c g b
 Tribasodites Jeannel, 1960
Data sources: i = ITIS, c = Catalogue of Life, g = GBIF, b = Bugguide.net

References

Further reading

 
 
 
 
 
 
 
 
 
 
 
 
 
 
 

Supertribes
Pselaphinae